Ajit (Daily Ajit) is a Punjabi language daily newspaper published in Jalandhar, India. The newspaper is run by Sadhu Singh Humdrad Trust . The newspaper was founded in 1941 in Urdu language. Veteran journalist and ex-Rajya Sabha member, Barjinder Singh Hamdard, is the current editor-in-chief. In 2007–08, it claimed a circulation of more than 333 thousand.

History

Ajit started its circulation with an Urdu language weekly edition in 1941 from Shaheed Sikh Missionary College Amritsar. Ajit Singh Ambalvi was its first editor. In November 1942, it became a daily newspaper and began printing from Lahore. After independence it moved its base to Jalandhar and Sadhu Singh Hamdard became its editor. In 1955, its name was changed to Ajit Patrika and the language was changed from Urdu to Punjabi. Later in 1957, its name was changed back to Ajit. After Hamdard's death in 1984, its present editor Barjinder Singh Hamdard took charge. In 1996, a Hindi edition titled "Ajit Samachar" was commenced and in 2002 its website was launched.
Ajit established a new milestone in its historic journey by starting Hindi daily Ajit named “Ajit Samachar” to further widen the circle of its readership. It was a new and fresh message in the field of journalism. It is gratifying indeed, that Ajit Samachar, keeping its traditions alive has not only made big strides on the chosen path but has also been discharging its responsibilities in a very effective manner. This newspaper has widened the horizons of the group. Today it is successfully hosting its flag in Haryana Himachal and Jammu Kashmir.

Editors
Ajit Singh Ambalvi (1941–1947)
Sadhu Singh Hamdard (1947–1984)
Barjinder Singh Hamdard (1984–Present)

See also
Khalsa Akhbar Lahore
Punjabi Tribune
List of newspapers
List of newspapers in India by circulation
List of newspapers in the world by circulation

References

External links
Official Punjabi website
Official Hindi website

Hindi-language newspapers
India
1941 establishments in India
Newspapers established in 1941
Jalandhar
Mass media in Punjab, India